The Canadian Trotting Classic is a harness race for three-year-old Standardbred trotters run at a distance of one mile at Mohawk Racetrack in Campbellville, Ontario. The event was first run on October 22, 1976 at the now defunct Greenwood Raceway.

Locations
Greenwood Raceway : 1978-1993
Woodbine Racetrack :  1994 - 2001 
Mohawk Racetrack : 2002 to present

Records
 Most wins by a driver
 3 – Ronald Pierce (2003, 2005, 2007) 

 Most wins by a trainer
 5 – Jimmy Takter (1997, 2002, 2014, 2015, 2016) †

 Stakes record
 1:52 2/5 –  Majestic Son (2006), Lucky Chucky (2010),  Market Share (2012), Royalty For Life (2013)

Winners of the Canadian Trotting Classic

References

Recurring sporting events established in 1976
Harness racing in Canada
Horse races in Ontario
Mohawk Racetrack